Senator Clough may refer to:

David Marston Clough (1846–1924), Minnesota State Senate
L. B. Clough (1850–1926), Washington State Senate